Sneyd is a suburb of Bristol, England.

Sneyd may also refer to:

Places
Sneyd Green  is an area in the city of Stoke-on-Trent, England

People
 Marc Sneyd (born 1991), English rugby league footballer
 Ralph Sneyd (1564–1643), English politician and soldier
 William Sneyd (MP for Staffordshire) (c. 1614–1695), English politician
 William Sneyd (MP for Lichfield) (c. 1693–1745), English politician
 William Sneyd (footballer), English footballer